General elections were held in the Marshall Islands on 18 November 2019. Opponents of President Hilda Heine won a majority of seats.

Background
The 2015 elections saw a significant defeat for the government of incumbent President Christopher Loeak, with five cabinet ministers losing their seats. Following the elections, Casten Nemra was elected as President on 4 January 2016 by a margin of one vote. However, he was removed from office two weeks later by a vote of no confidence ending 21–12 in favour of dismissing him. On 27 January 2016 Hilda Heine was elected the country's first female president. She narrowly survived a vote of no confidence on 12 November 2018; the vote was tied at 16–16 as one member of the Legislature was abroad for medical treatment.

Electoral system
The 33 members of the Nitijeļā were elected in 19 single-member constituencies via first-past-the-post voting and five multi-member constituencies of between two and five seats via plurality block voting.

Results

Hilda Heine and Kitlang Kabua were the only two women elected, with Kabua becoming the youngest member ever of the legislature at age 28.

Presidential election

References

 
Marshall
General election
Elections in the Marshall Islands
Marshallese general election
Election and referendum articles with incomplete results